Kessler Institute for Rehabilitation is a division of the Select Medical Corporation that provides physical medicine and rehabilitation programs and services. There are currently three inpatient rehabilitation facilities located throughout New Jersey. On June 1, 2010, Kessler Institute for Rehabilitation was awarded the Gallup Organization Great Workplace Award. The award is presented to the best performing workplaces in the world. Kessler Institute for Rehabilitation was one of only 25 recipients of the award. Kessler has also been ranked among the top one percent of rehabilitation hospitals by U.S. News & World Report.

Mission statement
Kessler Institute for Rehabilitation has the following mission statement:

Locations

West Orange campus
The West Orange campus, located in West Orange, New Jersey, currently operates 152 beds and specializes in the following:

 Severe disorders of consciousness
 Ventilator management
 Spinal cord injury
 Brain injury
 Stroke
 Amputation

Saddle Brook campus
The Saddle Brook campus, located in Saddle Brook, New Jersey, currently operates 112 beds and specializes in the following:

 Stroke
 Brain injury
 Amputation
 Neurological conditions, including multiple sclerosis, ALS, and Parkinson's disease
 Joint replacement
 Orthopedic trauma

Chester campus
The Chester campus, located in Chester, New Jersey, currently operates 72 beds and specializes in the following:

 Brain injury
 Stroke
 Neurological conditions
 Amputation
 Joint replacement
 Orthopedic trauma

History
 1948 - Kessler Institute for Rehabilitation founded in West Orange, New Jersey by Henry H. Kessler, M.D.
 1949 - First patients admitted on January 3 
 1953 - New building housing large gymnasium, physical therapy department, and prosthetics shop dedicated
 1956 - Kessler receives a $90,000 grant from the New Jersey State Rehabilitation Commission to establish a pre-vocational diagnostic unit, the first of its kind in the state 
 1959 - Groundbreaking ceremonies are held for a new 48-bed patient wing on the West Orange campus 
 1961 - New patient wing is dedicated and a swimming pool is constructed 
 1970 -	Urology Services Department added to Kessler-West Orange 
 1973 - Groundbreaking is held for a new wing that will expand patient rooms, programs, and services 
 1974 -	New wing that includes an additional 28 patient beds; outpatient gyms; speech, vocational, and social services areas; hydrotherapy center; and a new dining room and kitchen 
 1982 - Kessler purchases the New Jersey Rehabilitation Hospital in East Orange, New Jersey; the facility becomes known as Kessler Institute for Rehabilitation – East Orange campus 
 1986 - Kessler opens a 36-bed rehabilitation facility in space leased from the Saddle Brook/Kennedy Memorial Hospital in Saddle Brook, New Jersey 
 1989 - Kessler acquires the Welkind Rehabilitation Hospital in Chester, New Jersey, which becomes known as Kessler Institute for Rehabilitation – Chester campus 
 1990 - Kessler adds a three-story wing to its West Orange campus for physician offices, expanded urology and radiology services, and research and education areas 
 1993 - Kessler acquires the Saddle Brook/Kennedy Memorial Hospital in Saddle Brook, New Jersey; it becomes Kessler Institute for Rehabilitation – Saddle Brook campus 
 2003 - Kessler Rehabilitation Corporation is acquired by Select Medical Corporation 
 2005 - Groundbreaking ceremonies mark the beginning of construction on a new three-story addition to the Kessler West Orange campus 
 2007 - East Orange campus is closed; services and staff are transferred to the West Orange and Saddle Brook campuses 
 2008 - Kessler celebrates its 60th anniversary

References

External links
 

Healthcare in New Jersey
Hospital networks in the United States
Hospitals established in 1948
1948 establishments in New Jersey
West Orange, New Jersey
Medical and health organizations based in New Jersey
Hospitals in Essex County, New Jersey
Hospitals in Bergen County, New Jersey
Rehabilitation hospitals